Thomas Wright, usually referred to by the nickname G.V., (born 3 August 1947) is an Irish former Fianna Fáil politician. He was a Teachta Dála (TD) for the Dublin North constituency.

Wright was born in Dublin in 1947. He was educated at Chanel College, Coolock in Dublin before becoming a food retailer. In his youth Wright played Gaelic football for the Dublin county team and was an international basketball player and coach. He first held public office in 1982, when he was nominated by the Taoiseach to Seanad Éireann. He remained there until 1983; however, he also entered local politics in 1985 as a member of Dublin County Council. He remained there until 2004 and is among those named by lobbyist Frank Dunlop at the investigating Mahon Tribunal as receiving donations from property developers.

Wright was first elected to Dáil Éireann at the 1987 general election. He lost his seat at the 1989 general election but was again nominated to the Seanad where he served as Leader of Seanad Éireann (1991–1994) and Leader of Fianna Fáil in Seanad Éireann (1994–1997). During this time Wright failed again to obtain re-election to the Dáil. He finally succeeded at the 1997 general election and held his seat in another election in 2002.

In September 2003, as Wright drove home from Leinster House, his car collided with a female pedestrian at North Strand in Dublin causing multiple fractures to her leg. Tests confirmed that Wright's blood alcohol content was above the legal limit. As a result, he was fined and banned from driving for two years.

He retired from politics at the 2007 general election.

In March 2012, the final report of the Mahon Tribunal found that Wright received a £5,000 "corrupt" payment from Christopher Jones in November 1992 in relation to the Ballycullen/Beechill rezoning projects. On 27 March 2012, Wright resigned from Fianna Fáil before he could be expelled.

References

 

1947 births
Living people
Businesspeople from Dublin (city)
Councillors of Dublin County Council
Dublin inter-county Gaelic footballers
Fianna Fáil senators
Fianna Fáil TDs
Irish sportsperson-politicians
Local councillors in Fingal
Members of the 16th Seanad
Members of the 19th Seanad
Members of the 20th Seanad
Members of the 25th Dáil
Members of the 28th Dáil
Members of the 29th Dáil
Nominated members of Seanad Éireann
People from Coolock
Politicians from County Dublin
People educated at Chanel College, Dublin